Good Morning Club was a morning television program shown on TV5. The show debuted on February 6, 2012. replacing Sapul sa Singko and Kumare Klub, this show aired every Mondays to Fridays, 5:30 to 7:00 AM (PST), and was also simulcast with AksyonTV. It was replaced by Aksyon sa Umaga.

History
Good Morning Club began airing on February 6, 2012, as a merger of two morning shows, namely Sapul sa Singko and Kumare Klub. Originally aired from 5:00-7:30 am, the program later cut its airing to two hours (from 5:00-7:00 am) and expanded to three hours (from 5:00-8:00 am) in 2013. It simulcasted on AksyonTV, as well as on Radyo5 92.3 News FM from 5:30-6:00 am.

On October 14, 2013, as part of the launch of the network's Everyday All the Way campaign, the show underwent a reformat where it implemented a "4-in-1" format consisting of 'Good Morning, Grace' (which was later axed), 'Good Morning Sir!', 'Good Morning Girls' and 'Good Morning, MamuTin!'. At the same time, the program was also shortened to two hours (from 6:00-8:00 am), then expanded to 2 hours and 30 minutes (from 5:30-8:00 am).

Good Morning Club aired its final episode on May 2, 2014, and was replaced by its former segment, Good Morning Ser, which began on May 5.

Cancellation
The final airing of Good Morning Ser was on July 18, 2014, and was replaced by the first of four editions of the network's flagship news program Aksyon, Aksyon sa Umaga, which began on July 21.

Final hosts
 Cheryl Cosim (co-Host of the segment "Good Morning Girls")
 Martin Andanar (co-Host of the segment "Good Morning Sir!")
 Grace Lee (Co-Host of the segment "Good Morning Girls" & 'Good Morning, Grace')
 Tintin Babao (Host of the segment "Good Morning, MamuTin!")
 Lourd de Veyra (co-Host of the segment "Good Morning Sir!")
 Twink Macaraig† (co-Host of the segment "Good Morning Girls")
 Tuesday Vargas (co-Host of the segment "Good Morning Girls")
 Ina Zara ("Mobile 5" segment reporter)
 Trish Roque ("Mobile 5" segment reporter)
 Laila Chikadora ("Mobile 5" and "Traffic Na Ba?" segment reporter and "Aksyon Weather" anchor)
 Jun Sabayton ("Chickang Bayaw"'' Segment Host)
 Mon Gualvez (reporter)

Former hosts
 Erwin Tulfo
 Paolo Bediones
 Amy Perez
 Edu Manzano
 Chiqui Roa-Puno
 Pat Fernandez
 Lucky Mercado
 Shalala
 Makata Tawanan
 April Gustillo
 Joseph Ubalde

Final segments
 Good Morning Sir (5:30 - 7:00) - Martin Andanar and Lourd de Veyra
 Hitlist - Short discussion on 3 top stories of the day.
 Presinto 5 - Police Reports
 Now Showing - Videos from internet and CCTV cameras.
 Mobile 5 - Ina Zara, Trish Roque and Laila Chikadora
 Punto Asintado 
 Traffic Na Ba? - Traffic Update (Laila Chikadora)
 Aksyon Weather - Weather Forecast (Laila Chikadora)
 Chikang Bayaw - Showbiz News (Jun Sabayton)
 Love Hurts - Love Story and Love Advice (formerly from Sapul sa Singko)
 Good Morning Girls (7:00 - 7:45) - Cheryl Cosim, Twink Macaraig, Grace Lee and Tuesday Vargas  
 Talkathon - Discussions about Issues
 Good Morning MamuTin (7:45 - 8:00) - Tintin Babao

Former segments
Morning Balita - News (6:00 and 7:00) Anchored by Paolo Bediones, Cheryl Cosim and Grace Lee
Headlines - Top Stories of the day
Presinto 5 - Police Reports (Martin Andanar)
Probinsya Balita - Provincial/Regional News
Caught In The ACT - CCTV Reports
Aksyon Weather - Weather Forecast (Joseph Ubalde)
Globalita - World News 
Neti-Sense-  Social Media Comments
Morning Traffic - Traffic Updates 
Feature News
Teknolohiyang Balita - Technology News
Sports News
Kumare at Your Service - Public Service
Chiz-Mwah - Showbiz News (Shalala)
Isyu - Discussion on the hottest issue of the day
Makata Adventures (Makata-Tawanan)
OK Ka Lang? - Health Tips (Cheryl Cosim)
Chiqui Dance (Chiqui Roa-Puno)
Luto Na Ba T'yang? - Recipe of the day (Twink Macaraig)
Kumare Tips (Chiqui Roa-Puno, Amy Perez and Tintin Babao)
What the Fact? - Trivia (Paolo Bediones)

See also
 List of programs aired by TV5 (Philippine TV network)
 List of programs aired by AksyonTV/5 Plus

References

External links
 

TV5 (Philippine TV network) original programming
News5 shows
Philippine television news shows
2012 Philippine television series debuts
2014 Philippine television series endings
Breakfast television in the Philippines
Filipino-language television shows